In aviation, ceiling is a measurement of the height of the base of the lowest clouds (not to be confused with cloud base which has a specific definition) that cover more than half of the sky (more than 4 oktas) relative to the ground. Ceiling is not specifically reported as part of the METAR (METeorological Aviation Report) used for flight planning by pilots worldwide, but can be deduced from the lowest height with broken (BKN) or overcast (OVC) reported. A ceiling listed as "unlimited" means either that the sky is mostly free of cloud cover, or that the cloud is high enough not to impede Visual Flight Rules (VFR) operation.

Definitions 

 ICAO  The height above the ground or water of the base of the lowest layer of cloud below 6000 meters (20,000 feet) covering more than half the sky.

 United Kingdom  The vertical distance from the elevation of an aerodrome to the lowest part of any cloud visible from the aerodrome which is sufficient to obscure more than half of the sky.

 United States  The height above the Earth's surface of the lowest layer of clouds or obscuring phenomena that is reported as broken, overcast, or obscuration, and not classified as thin or partial.

See also 

 Cloud base

References

Aviation meteorology